Kyrie, also called Kyrie eleison, is the common name of an important prayer of Christian liturgy.

Kyrie may also refer to:

Music
 Kyrie (Vivaldi), a composition by Antonio Vivaldi
 Kyrie in F major, K. 33, a composition by Wolfgang Amadeus Mozart
 Kyrie in D minor, K. 341, a composition by Wolfgang Amadeus Mozart
 Kyrie (album), an album by Mina
 "Kyrie" (song), a song by Mr. Mister
 "Kyrie", a song by Kalafina
 "Kyrie", a song by Sheck Wes

Other uses
 Kyrie (given name), a given name (and list of people and fictional characters with the name)
 "Kyrie", a 1969 science fiction story by Poul Anderson
 Kyrie, a fictional race in HeroScape

See also

 Kairi (disambiguation)
 Karie (disambiguation)
 Kirie (disambiguation)
 "Kyrie Eleison" (song), a song by the Electric Prunes
 "Kyrie Eleison", a song by Fates Warning on their 1985 album The Spectre Within